Gonzalo Gil (born September 8, 1989) is a retired Argentine footballer, who played as a forward.

Career
Gil started playing amateur football with the team of Campo Chico, the gated neighbourhood where he lived with his family. In 2007, a member of the directive board of Argentine Primera División giants River Plate watched him play and asked him to join the club's youth divisions. In 2008, playing for River's reserves, he scored the winning goal in the 1-0 victory over Boca Juniors' reserves in the Superclásico. He debuted with the first team under the guidance of coach Diego Simeone during the 2008 Apertura on a 0-1 defeat to Gimnasia y Esgrima de Jujuy.

For the 2010–11 season, Gil was loaned along fellow River Plate companion Matías Díaz to Chilean Primera División side Ñublense.

References

External links
 
 

Living people
1989 births
Footballers from Buenos Aires
Argentine footballers
Argentine expatriate footballers
Club Atlético River Plate footballers
Ñublense footballers
Olaria Atlético Clube players
Centro Atlético Fénix players
Defensores de Belgrano footballers
Argentine Primera División players
Argentine expatriate sportspeople in Chile
Argentine expatriate sportspeople in Brazil
Expatriate footballers in Chile
Expatriate footballers in Brazil
Association football forwards